Dinophilidae is a family of annelids of uncertain phylogenetic affinity comprising the two genera Dinophilus and Trilobodrilus, first linked based on their sperm morphology.

References 

Polychaetes
Enigmatic eukaryote taxa